A penumbral lunar eclipse took place on Friday, December 29, 1944. In a rare total penumbral eclipse, the entire Moon was partially shaded by the Earth (though none of it was in complete shadow), and the shading across the Moon should have been quite visible at maximum eclipse. The penumbral phase lasted for 4 hours and 27 minutes in all, though for most of it, the eclipse was extremely difficult or impossible to see.

Visibility

Related lunar eclipses

Lunar year series

Saros series
Lunar Saros series 114, repeating every 18 years and 11 days, has a total of 71 lunar eclipse events including 13 total lunar eclipses.

First Penumbral Lunar Eclipse: 0971 May 13

First Partial Lunar Eclipse: 1115 Aug 07

First Total Lunar Eclipse: 1458 Feb 28

First Central Lunar Eclipse: 1530 Apr 12

Greatest Eclipse of Lunar Saros 114: 1584 May 24

Last Central Lunar Eclipse: 1638 Jun 26

Last Total Lunar Eclipse: 1674 Jul 17

Last Partial Lunar Eclipse: 1890 Nov 26

Last Penumbral Lunar Eclipse: 2233 Jun 22

See also
List of lunar eclipses
List of 20th-century lunar eclipses

Notes

External links

1944-12
1944 in science